Coimbatore Narayana Rao Raghavendran is an Indian technocrat from Chennai, Tamil Nadu and the partner of C. R. Narayana Rao Architects and Engineers, a Chennai-based engineering concern. He graduated from the Indian Institute of Technology, Kharagpur and did higher studies at Cornell University in the United States. Working in Boston for brief period, Raghavendran returned to India to join his family business established by his father, C. R. Narayana Rao, in 1945. He was honored by the Government of India, in 2011, with the fourth highest Indian civilian award of Padma Shri.

References

Living people
Recipients of the Padma Shri in science & engineering
Artists from Chennai
Year of birth missing (living people)
20th-century Indian architects